Sefid Tur may refer to:
 Sefid Tur-e Bala
 Sefid Tur-e Pain